This is a listing of all of the bus transit routes operated by Monterey–Salinas Transit in Monterey County, California.

Route numbering
 01–19: Local routes, Monterey Peninsula
 20–29: Regional routes, intercity services
 30–39: Local routes, South County
 40–49: Local routes, Salinas area
 50–59: Regional routes, express services
 60-69: Regional routes, Veteran's Shuttle
 70–79: Local and regional routes, Presidio (military) service
 80–89: Regional routes, Fort Hunter Liggett
 90–99: Local routes, Senior Shuttle

In 2020, MST began its Comprehensive Operational Analysis to redesign its route network, seeking to prioritize improved service frequency and travel time. The Final Network Plan was released in February 2022 and multiple routes were discontinued.

Fixed route network

Monterey Peninsula Local Lines

Regional & Commuter Lines

South County Local Lines

Salinas Local Lines

Veteran’s Shuttle Lines

Presidio Commuter Lines
All Lines Discontinued

Fort Hunter Liggett Lines
All Lines Eliminated

Senior Shuttle Lines

Special Event Service

MST also offers supplemental service to selected events throughout Monterey County. Event ticket holders ride free for all Special Event trips.  Special Event Lines are no longer numbered, check mst.org for special event service shuttles

Seasonal Trolleys
These free shuttles operate on a timetable-free loop using coaches styled after turn-of-the-century streetcars.

Suspended and Discontinued Lines
After the COVID-19 pandemic in California decreased ridership sharply and as part of the Comprehensive Operational Analysis implementation, many legacy lines were suspended or discontinued.

Demand responsive and paratransit services

Demand Responsive service
These lines offer custom "dial a ride" service to neighborhoods and shopping areas, and provide timed transfers to MST's regular fixed-route network. Trips may be scheduled by calling a toll-free number at least one hour in advance. Standing daily and weekly appointments may also be made.

|-

ADA Paratransit service
MST Rides is a program offered to those persons who have a disability that prevents them from using MST's regular fixed-route service.

References

External links
 

Monterey–Salinas Transit